Muhammad Ahmad (born 31 July 1941), also known as Max Stanford and Maxwell Curtis Stanford, is an American civil rights activist and one of the founders of the Revolutionary Action Movement (RAM), a Marxist–Leninist black power organisation, which was active from 1962 to 1967. He currently teaches in the department of African American Studies at Temple University in Philadelphia.

Political activism

Early life 
Max Stanford was born on 31 July 1941 in Philadelphia, Pennsylvania. He described his family as "very political" and attributes the development of his political consciousness to his father. He graduated from West Philadelphia High School and attended Central State College in Wilberforce, Ohio from 1960 to 1962.

Founding the Revolutionary Action Movement (RAM) 
In 1961, an off-campus chapter of the Students for a Democratic Society (SDS), called Challenge, was formed by students from Central State College. According to Stanford, Challenge possessed no basic ideology. By 1962, the group came into contact with Donald Freeman, a school teacher from Cleveland, Ohio. With the guidance of Freeman, Challenge eventually transformed into RAM, a group which was based on Marxist–Leninist and black nationalist ideas. The group initially called themselves the Reform Action Movement because they felt the term "revolutionary" would cause panic among the college's administration.

After RAM managed to take over the student government of Central State College, some members wanted to continue their activism on campus, while other members, including Stanford, wanted to return to their respective communities and become full-time activists. Stanford and another RAM member, Wanda Marshall, met with Malcolm X in New York and asked if they should join the Nation of Islam. Malcolm replied “You can do more for the Honorable Elijah Muhammad by organizing outside of the Nation”.

COINTELPRO 
Starting from 1956, the Federal Bureau of Investigation (FBI) began the covert COINTELPRO campaign to infiltrate, discredit and disrupt organisations which were considered subversive. RAM was one of the groups targeted by the program and Stanford was even referred to as "the most dangerous man in America", by J. Edgar Hoover. In 1966, Stanford was arrested in New York, along with 15 other RAM members, accused of conspiring to assassinate NAACP leader Roy Wilkins and the Urban League's Whitney Young. Stanford was acquitted of the charges and he returned to Philadelphia to establish the Black Guard, a youth and self-defense wing of RAM.

In 1967, RAM was under the surveillance of Philadelphia police and the FBI. Police arrested Stanford on 26 July 1967, accusing RAM of planning to start a riot. Over the next month, 35 other RAM members were also arrested. Subsequently, Stanford dissolved RAM in 1968 and its members joined other organisations.

Personal life 
After RAM was dissolved, Stanford converted to Islam in 1970 and changed his name to Muhammad Ahmad. He earned a Bachelor of Arts degree from the University of Massachusetts and a Master of Arts from Atlanta University in 1986. He completed his Ph.D. in Union Institute and University in 1992.

In 2011, Muhammad Ahmad stated in an interview with The Temple News,"I’m just a servant of the people and a servant of Allah. I don’t separate the two. I just think that the pursuit of happiness, equality, freedom and justice is the overwhelming will of the majority of people on planet Earth".

References 

1941 births
African-American activists
Temple University faculty
Living people